Earl of Danby was a title that was created twice in the Peerage of England. The first creation came in 1626 in favour of the soldier Henry Danvers, 1st Baron Danvers. He had already been created Baron Danvers, of Dauntsey in the County of Wiltshire, in 1603, also in the Peerage of England. The titles became extinct on his death in 1644. The second creation came in 1674 in favour of Thomas Osborne, 1st Viscount Latimer. He was the son of Anne, daughter of Thomas Walmesley and Eleanor Danvers, sister of the first Earl of the first creation. For more information on the second creation, see Duke of Leeds.

Earls of Danby; First creation (1626)
Henry Danvers, 1st Earl of Danby (1573–1644)

Earls of Danby; Second creation (1674)
see Duke of Leeds

References

Extinct earldoms in the Peerage of England
Noble titles created in 1626
Noble titles created in 1674